Pierre Niney (born 13 March 1989) is a Belgian-French actor. He made his acting debut in the two-part television miniseries La dame d'Izieu in 2007, followed by films such as LOL (Laughing Out Loud), The Army of Crime, Romantics Anonymous and Comme des frères. In October 2010, at age 21, he became the youngest member of the Comédie-Française. In 2014, Niney starred as fashion designer Yves Saint Laurent in the biopic of the same name, for which he won a César Award for Best Actor.

Early life
His family is of Sephardic Jewish (Egyptian-Jewish) and Catholic background. His mother was born in Belgium, and he consider himself half-belgian.

Filmography

Film

Television

Awards and nominations

References

External links

 

1989 births
21st-century French male actors
Cours Florent alumni
French National Academy of Dramatic Arts alumni
French male film actors
French male stage actors
French male television actors
Living people
People from Boulogne-Billancourt
Troupe of the Comédie-Française
Best Actor César Award winners
French people of Egyptian-Jewish descent
French Sephardi Jews
Mizrahi Jews